Frank Gehry is a Pritzker Prize-winning architect. His buildings, including his private residence, have become tourist attractions. His style is sometimes described as Deconstructivist or postmodern, although he has rejected the second term.

Completed

Works in progress

In Construction
Warner Brothers Second Century, Burbank, California

Proposed
World's Jewish Museum, Tel Aviv, Israel
Torre La Sagrera in Barcelona, Spain
Ocean Avenue Project, Santa Monica, California
Mirvish Towers & Princess of Wales Theatre, Toronto, Ontario, Canada (proposed – no start date yet)
Jazz Bakery, Culver City, California
Luxury hotel, apartments and offices, Sønderborg, Denmark
Cultural Center, Łódź, Poland (design not yet accepted)
Dudamel Hall, Barquisimeto, Venezuela
Battersea Power Station redevelopment Phase 3 (the "High Street" phase), London, England (as joint architect along with Foster + Partners)
Colburn School Campus Extension and Concert Hall, Los Angeles, California

On hold

Frank Gehry Visitor Center at Hall Winery Napa Valley, Saint Helena, California (on hold)
The Point (Five Star Hotel & Event Center), Lehi, Utah (project on hold)
Suna Kıraç Cultural Center, Istanbul, Turkey (construction yet to begin)
The Carrie Hamilton Theatre, Pasadena Playhouse, Pasadena, California
Gary Player's Saadiyat Beach Golf Course Clubhouse, Abu Dhabi, United Arab Emirates

Unbuilt
Le Clos Jordanne Winery, Lincoln, Ontario, Canada
Museum of Tolerance, Jerusalem, Israel (Gehry stepped down from the project in March 2010)
Atlantic Yards, New York City (left project in June 2009)
Corcoran Gallery expansion, Washington, D.C. (project was abandoned in 2005)
Guggenheim Museum expansion campus in downtown New York City (project was abandoned in December 2002)
World Trade Center site Performing Arts Complex, New York City (announced October 2004, left project in 2014)

Other works
Easy Edges furniture collection (in production from 1969 to 1973)
Official trophy for the World Cup of Hockey (2004, 2016)
Superlight chair for Emeco (2004)
Louis Vuitton luggage (2014)
A yacht called Foggy (2015)
Bottle for Hennesy cognac (2020)
Jewellery collections for Tiffany & Co.

References

External links

Gehry Partners, LLP, Gehry's architecture firm

 
Gehry, Frank